Peter Mesesnel is a retired Slovenian footballer.

He played most of his career for NK Ljubljana.

External links
 Stats at PrvaLiga.

Slovenian footballers
NK Ljubljana players
NK Domžale players
Living people
1971 births
Footballers from Ljubljana
Association football midfielders